The Tenby town walls are Grade I-listed medieval defensive structures around the town of Tenby in Pembrokeshire. They are assessed as one of the most important surviving medieval city walls in Britain. The walls were built in the 13th century by the Earls of Pembroke and improved in the 1450s. They were last known to have been repaired in 1588 and have declined thereafter. Most of the town's gates were demolished beginning in the 18th century and only one survives.

History

The Marshal family, Earls of Pembroke to 1245, may have started construction of the walls, replacing an earthen rampart of the late 12th century, and they were completed by William de Valence, 1st Earl of Pembroke after Tenby was sacked in 1260 by Llewelyn ap Gruffydd. Jasper Tudor, Duke of Bedford ordered the walls repaired and improved in 1457. They were raised  in height and widened to allow the garrison to move about freely. The walls were repaired in 1588; there is a tablet on the wall commemorates the work.

Description
There were originally four gates, but the Great or Carmarthen Gate was removed in 1781, the South Gate in 1797 and the Quay Gate in 1811. Only the semi-circular Five Arches Gate survives. Six towers survive, although there may have been up to 24 originally. At one time there were walls connecting the city to Tenby Castle, but they are no longer extant. The walls are generally built of rubble stone with arrow loops and a crenellated parapet. There is a short stretch west from Upper Frog Street along White Lion Street to the bastion at the corner of White Lion Street and South Parade and then the most intact portion runs south beside South Parade and St Florence Parade to the sea.

See also
List of town walls in England and Wales

Notes

Bibliography

External links

Buildings and structures in Pembrokeshire
Grade I listed buildings in Pembrokeshire
Tenby
City walls in the United Kingdom
Scheduled monuments in Pembrokeshire